Comatose is the sixth studio album by American Christian rock band Skillet. Released on October 3, 2006, by Lava Records, Ardent Records and Atlantic Records, this album continues their previous album's trend of downplaying the keyboard elements that were prominent in previous releases in favor of more orchestral elements and distorted guitars. Comatose was certified gold by the Recording Industry Association of America (RIAA) on November 3, 2009, their first record to do so, and has since gone platinum, selling over 1,000,000 copies as of May 20, 2016. On December 6, 2007, the album also received a Grammy Award nomination for Best Rock or Rap Gospel Album. A deluxe edition of Comatose was then released in stores on December 26, 2007, and a live DVD of their headlining tour in support of the record was released in the fall 2008.

This is the last album drummer Lori Peters recorded with the band.

Reception 

Comatose has mainly received positive reviews. AllMusic praised its unique mixture of instruments, saying, "When guitar progressions meet piano nuances, special things happen with this band." Jesusfreakhideout.com also gave the album a high rating; "Filled with big songs from beginning to end, Comatose relies on more theatrics to build their sound while delivering substance at the same time."  Christianity Today, while mostly giving the album positive remarks, felt that the ballads were a bit too pop-oriented compared to the heavier songs. They also found some of the lyrics to be generic. IGN.com gave the album a mixed review, commenting, "This may play well within that niche market of Christian music, as many of the traditional listeners eschew 'secular' radio. But anyplace else, this album will be ignored by the masses, as it's all been done before in one way or the other."

Track listing

Singles 
 "Rebirthing" -  RIAA: Gold
 "Whispers in the Dark" - RIAA: Platinum
 "The Older I Get"
 "The Last Night" - RIAA: Gold
 "Comatose" - RIAA: Platinum
 "Live Free or Let Me Die"
 "Those Nights"
 "Better than Drugs"

Personnel 
Skillet
 John L. Cooper – vocals, acoustic piano, guitars, bass guitar, additional string arrangements
 Korey Cooper – keyboards, acoustic piano, programming, guitars, vocals, additional string arrangements
 Ben Kasica – guitars
 Lori Peters – drums

Additional musicians
 Brian Howes – additional guitars, additional vocals
 Paul Buckmaster – string arrangements and conductor (1, 3)
 Suzie Katayama – string contractor (1, 3)

Technical personnel
 Zachary Kelm – executive producer, management
 John Cooper – producer 
 Brian Howes – producer
 Chris Lord-Alge – mixing at Resonate Sound (Burbank, California) (1, 3, 6, 9, 13, 14, 15, 17)
 David Bottrill – mixing at Metalworks Studios (Toronto, Canada) (2, 4, 5, 7, 8, 10, 11, 16)
 Richard Chycki – mixing (12)
 Jay Van Poederooyen – engineer, Pro Tools editing
 David Rieley – assistant engineer
 Sean Geyer – second assistant engineer
 Andy VanDette – mastering at Masterdisk (New York, NY)
 Mark "Patch" Patchel – drum tech
 Andy Karp – A&R
 Kevin Tully – A&R coordination
 Jeff Gros – photography
 Josh Horton – design
 Invisible Creature, Inc. – art direction 
 Gregg Nadel – product management

Charts

Certifications

Awards
In 2007, the album was nominated for a Dove Award for Rock Album of the Year at the 38th GMA Dove Awards.

References

External links
 Press Release (Microsoft Word document)
 Listen to full-length song, The Last Night

Skillet (band) albums
2006 albums